The Ahuroa River is a river in the Northland Region of the North Island of New Zealand.

It is a tributary of the Waipu River which it joins close to the town of Waipu.

References

Whangarei District
Rivers of the Northland Region
Rivers of New Zealand